Re:Gex is a comic book created by Rob Liefeld and published through Awesome Comics.

Plot
The world is ruled by a dictator named Lord Sharpe. Fighting against his rule are a band of mutants and cyborgs called Re:Gex. They are led by a man named Scarab. Scarab previously worked for Lord Sharpe but rebelled against his master when he encountered an angel during one of his missions.

External links